This is a list of the National Register of Historic Places listings in Fisher County, Texas.

This is intended to be a complete list of properties listed on the National Register of Historic Places in Fisher County, Texas. There is one property listed on the National Register in the county.

Current listings 

|}

See also

National Register of Historic Places listings in Texas
Recorded Texas Historic Landmarks in Fisher County

References
 

Fisher County, Texas
Fisher County
Buildings and structures in Fisher County, Texas